Acestrorhynchus isalineae is a species of fish in the family Acestrorhynchidae. It was described by Naércio Aquino de Menezes and Jacques Géry in 1983. It is known from the Madeira River
in Brazil.

The fish was named in honor of Isaline Drecq, wife of Guy van den Bossche, who was a participant in the expedition that collected the type specimens.

References

Acestrorhynchidae
Taxa named by Naércio Aquino de Menezes
Taxa named by Jacques Géry
Fish described in 1983